Josef Zwernemann (26 March 1916 – 8 April 1944) was a German Luftwaffe military aviator during World War II and a fighter ace credited with 126 enemy aircraft shot down in over 600 combat missions. The majority of his victories were claimed on the Eastern Front, with ten aerial victories claimed over the Western Front during the Battle of Britain and in Defense of the Reich.

Born in Kirchworbis, Zwernemann volunteered for military service in the Kriegsmarine of Nazi Germany in 1935 and transferred to the Luftwaffe a year later. Following flight training, he was posted to Jagdgeschwader 52 (JG 52—52nd Fighter Wing) in 1940. Zwernemann participated in the Battle of France and Battle of Britain where he claimed his first three aerial victory on 24 July 1940. In July 1941, he fought in the Battle of Crete and Operation Barbarossa, the German invasion of the Soviet Union. Following his 57th aerial victory he was awarded the Knight's Cross of the Iron Cross on 23 June 1942 and the Knight's Cross of the Iron Cross with Oak Leaves on 31 October 1942 after 102 aerial victories.

In December 1943, Setz was appointed Staffelkapitän (group commander) of the 1. Staffel (1st squadron) of Jagdgeschwader 11 (JG 11—11th Fighter Wing) which was based in Germany and fighting in Defense of the Reich. Zwernemann claimed nine more victories before he was killed in action in combat with a North American P-51 Mustangs on 8 April 1944.

Early life and career
Zwernemann was born on 26 March 1916 in Kirchworbis in the Province of Thuringia. He was the son of a cordwainer who later worked as a miner. Following graduation from school, Zwernemann worked as a clerk (Handlungsgehilfe) in the metal industry. Zwernemann joined the military service of the Kriegsmarine on 1 October 1935 with the 2nd department of the standing ship division of the Baltic Sea in Stralsund. On 2 January 1936, he transferred to the Luftwaffe where he was assigned to the Fliegerhorstkompanie (Airfield Company) in Holtenau.

On 1 April 1938, Zwernemann was promoted to Unteroffizier (non-commissioned officer) and was trained as a pilot. Flight training in the Luftwaffe progressed through the levels A1, A2 and B1, B2, referred to as A/B flight training. A training included theoretical and practical training in aerobatics, navigation, long-distance flights and dead-stick landings. The B courses included high-altitude flights, instrument flights, night landings and training to handle the aircraft in difficult situations.

World War II
World War II in Europe began on Friday 1 September 1939 when German forces invaded Poland. Following flight training, Zwernemann was posted to the newly created 7. Staffel (7th squadron) of Jagdgeschwader 52 (JG 52–52nd Fighter Wing) began on 1 March 1940. At the time, 7. Staffel was commanded by Oberleutnant Herbert Ferner. The Staffel was subordinated to III. Gruppe (3rd group) of JG 52 headed by Major Wolf-Heinrich von Houwald. The Gruppe had been formed on 1 March 1940 at Strausberg and was equipped with the Messerschmitt Bf 109 E-1 and E-3. On 6 April, the Gruppe was moved to Mannheim-Sandhofen Airfield where it was placed under the control of the Stab (headquarter unit) of Jagdgeschwader 53 (JG 53–53rd Fighter Wing).

Zwernemann participated in the Battle of France on 10 May 1940. III. Gruppe supported the German attack of Army Group A in northern France, Luxembourg and the area of the Ardennes in southern Belgium. On 18 June, III. Gruppe was withdrawn from combat operations in France and relocated back to Germany. In preparation for the Battle of Britain, the Gruppe began moving to English Channel on 20 July, arriving at an airfield near Coquelles located southwest of Calais two days later. On 24 July, III. Gruppe flew its first combat air patrols where they encountered Royal Air Force fighters off of Margate during a Kanalkampf mission. In this encounter, Zwernemann claimed his first aerial victory over a Supermarine Spitfire fighter. His Rottenflieger (wing man) on this mission was Edmund Roßmann. That day, 7. Staffel lost its Staffelkapitän Fermer who was killed in action. He was replaced by Oberleutnant Wilhelm Keidel who was killed the next day. Keidel was then temporarily succeeded by Oberleutnant Willy Bielefeld who was also killed on 25 July. This led to the assignment of Hauptmann Erwin Bacsilla as temporary commander of 7. Staffel. The action on 24 July also resulted in the loss of Gruppenkommandeur Houwald who was temporarily succeeded by Hauptmann Wilhelm Ensslen. On 1 August, III. Gruppe was already withdrawn from the English Channel and moved to an airfield at Zerbst for a period of replenishment.

In defense of Germany's southeastern borders, with its primary objective defending the oil fields and refineries at Ploiești, Romania, the Luftwaffenmission Rumänien (Luftwaffe Mission Romania) was created. On 15 October, the Stab and 9. Staffel of III. Gruppe of JG 52 were sent to Bucharest Pipera Airfield, followed by 7. And 8. Staffel in late November. There, the III. Gruppe of JG 52 temporarily became the I. Gruppe of Jagdgeschwader 28 (JG 28—28th Fighter Wing). On 4 January 1941, the Gruppe again became the III. Gruppe of JG 52. There in April, Zwernemann was awarded the Iron Cross 2nd Class. On 25 May, III. Gruppe was sent to Greece where it was subordinated to Jagdgeschwader 77 (JG 77—77th Fighter Wing) and fought in the Battle of Crete.

War against the Soviet Union
Following its brief deployment in the Balkan Campaign, III. Gruppe was back in Bucharest by mid-June. There, the unit was again subordinated to the Luftwaffenmission Rumänien and reequipped with the new, more powerful Bf 109F-4 model. On 21 June, the Gruppe was ordered to Mizil in preparation of Operation Barbarossa, the German invasion of the Soviet Union. Its primary objective was to provide fighter protection for the oil fields and refineries at Ploiești. German forces launched the invasion on 22 June. Four days later, Zwernemann claimed his second aerial victory when he shot down a Soviet Ilyushin DB-3 bomber near Constanța. Following two aerial victories claimed over DB-3 bombers on 8 July northeast of Mamaia, he was awarded the Iron Cross 1st Class in August.

By the end of 1941, Zwernemann had claimed 25 aerial victories, and had been awarded the Honour Goblet of the Luftwaffe on 12 December 1941. In May 1942, the number of victories had increased by 32 and he was honored with the German Cross in Gold on 25 May 1942. Zwernemann received the Knight's Cross of the Iron Cross for 57 victories on 23 June 1942. In the month of September 1942 he claimed over thirty victories. On 1 October 1942, Zwernemann was promoted to Leutnant (second lieutenant) with a rank age date 1 October 1941.

Sources differ as to exactly when Zwernemann claimed his 100th aerial victory. According to Obermaier, Zwernemann claimed his 100th to 103rd victories on 1 October 1942. This would make him the 26th Luftwaffe pilot to achieve the century mark. The authors Bergström, Dikov, Antipov, and Sundin indicate that Zwernemann achieved his 100th aerial victory on 31 October. While authors Prien, Stemmer, Rodeike, and Bock date this event on 25 October. This is also the same date listed by Mathews and Foreman. Irrespective, Zwernemann was awarded Knight's Cross of the Iron Cross with Oak Leaves on 31 October 1942. He was the 141st member of the German armed forces to be so honored. The presentation was made by Adolf Hitler at the Wolf's Lair, Hitler's headquarters in Rastenburg. Two other Luftwaffe officers were presented with the Oak Leaves that day by Hitler, Hauptmann Wolfgang Schenck and Hauptmann Friedrich Lang. One of Zwernemanns' wingmen and students was history's top-scoring ace Erich Hartmann.

At the end of May 1943, Zwernemann was posted to the fighter pilot training school Ergänzungsgruppe Ost. On 1 October, he was promoted to Oberleutnant (first lieutenant) and returned to combat service with 3. Staffel of JG 77 based in Italy. The Staffel was commanded by Leutnant Ernst-Wilhelm Reinert and based at Tuscania.

Defense of the Reich and death
In November 1943, Zwernemann was transferred to Defense of the Reich duties in Germany. On 15 December 1943, he was posted to 1. Staffel of Jagdgeschwader 11 (JG 11–11th Fighter Wing) which at the time was based at Husum airfield. There, he initially served as acting Staffelführer (squadron leader), representing Hauptmann (Captain) Siegfried Simsch, before officially being appointed Staffelkapitän of 1. Staffel on 8 February 1944.

Zwernemann claimed his first aerial victory in this theater of operations on 10 February 1944. That day, the United States Army Air Forces (USAAF) targeted Braunschweig with 169 Boeing B-17 Flying Fortress bombers from the 3rd Bombardment Division. The primary objective were the Luther-Werke, a mechanical engineering company, and the repair facilities at Waggum. The bombers were escorted by 466 fighter aircraft. Zwernemann claimed the destruction of a Lockheed P-38 Lightning fighter that day. In total, the Luftwaffe claimed 51 aerial victories, including 32 four-engine bombers while the USAAF reported the loss of 30 four-engine bombers and eleven escort fighters.

On 8 April 1944, the Eighth Air Force again targeted Braunschweig as well as various Luftwaffe airfields in northwestern Germany and the Netherlands. In total the USAAF 664 four-engine bombers, escorted by 780 fighters, including 206 North American P-51 Mustangs, were intercepted by 20 Luftwaffe fighter groups. In this encounter, the Luftwaffe claimed 87 aerial victories, including 65 four-engine bombers. This figure includes a B-24 bomber and a P-51 fighter claimed shot down by Zwernemann taking his total to 126 aerial victories. Following this encounter, the USAAF reported the loss of 36 four-engine bombers and 25 escort fighters and claimed at least 158 Luftwaffe aircraft shot down plus further 55 destroyed on the ground. In total the Luftwaffe lost 78 aircraft destroyed, 42 pilots killed and another 13 wounded. Among those pilots killed in action was Zwernemann who was shot down in his Focke-Wulf Fw 190 A-7/R6 (Werknummer 431164—factory number) near Gardelegen, Altmark. His comrades, including Oberleutnant Fritz Engau from 2. Staffel, reported that Zwernemann had bailed out but was shot in his parachute by a P-51 pilot.

Zwernemann was given a military funeral and buried at the cemetery in Kirchworbis on 11 April 1944. His grave was ordered leveled by the authorities of East Germany in 1988. Posthumously, Zwernemann had been promoted to Hauptmann, his rank age backdated to 1 April 1944.

Summary of career

Aerial victory claims
According to US historian David T. Zabecki, Zwernemann was credited with 126 aerial victories. Spick also list Zwernemann with 126 aerial victories, of which 106 were claimed over the Eastern Front and further 20 over the Western Front and Mediterranean theater, claimed in approximately 600 combat missions. Mathews and Foreman, authors of Luftwaffe Aces – Biographies and Victory Claims, researched the German Federal Archives and found records for 123 aerial victory claims. This figure includes 116 aerial victories on the Eastern Front and seven over the Western Allies, including five four-engined bombers.

Victory claims were logged to a map-reference (PQ = Planquadrat), for example "PQ 49214". These sectors were then subdivided into 36 smaller units to give a location area 3 × 4 km in size.

Awards
 Iron Cross (1939)
 2nd Class (April 1941)
 1st Class (August 1941)
 Honor Goblet of the Luftwaffe on 15 December 1941 as Feldwebel and pilot
 German Cross in Gold on 11 May 1942 as Oberfeldwebel in the III./Jagdgeschwader 52
 Knight's Cross of the Iron Cross with Oak Leaves
 Knight's Cross on 23 June 1942 as Oberfeldwebel and pilot in the 7./Jagdgeschwader 52
 141st Oak Leaves on 31 October 1942 as Oberfeldwebel and pilot in the 7./Jagdgeschwader 52

Promotions

Translation notes

Notes

References

Citations

Bibliography

 
 
 
 
 
 
 
 
 
 
 
 
 
 
 
 
 
 
 
 
 
 
 
 
 
 
 
 
 
 

1916 births
1944 deaths
German World War II flying aces
Luftwaffe personnel killed in World War II
Luftwaffe pilots
Recipients of the Gold German Cross
Recipients of the Knight's Cross of the Iron Cross with Oak Leaves
Kriegsmarine personnel
Military personnel from Thuringia
Aviators killed by being shot down
People from Eichsfeld (district)